Lloyd James Austin III (born August 8, 1953) is a retired United States Army four-star general who, since his appointment on January 22, 2021, has served as the 28th United States Secretary of Defense. He is the first African American to serve as the United States Secretary of Defense. Austin previously served as the 12th commander of United States Central Command (CENTCOM) from 2013 to 2016.

Austin was the 33rd vice chief of staff of the Army from January 2012 to March 2013, and the last commanding general of United States Forces – Iraq Operation New Dawn, which ended in December 2011. In 2013, Austin was appointed as the first Black commander of CENTCOM by President Barack Obama. He retired from the armed services in 2016 and joined the boards of Raytheon Technologies, Nucor, Tenet Healthcare, and Auburn University. On December 7, 2020, he was nominated for defense secretary by then-President-elect Joe Biden. He was confirmed by the United States Senate on January 22, 2021, by a vote of 93–2.

Early life and education
Austin was born on August 8, 1953, in Mobile, Alabama; he was raised in Thomasville, Georgia. He graduated from the United States Military Academy at West Point with a Bachelor of Science degree in 1975, where he was commander of G-1 (G Company, 1st Regiment). He later earned a Master of Arts degree in counselor education from Auburn University's College of Education in 1986, and a Master of Business Administration in business management from Webster University in 1989. He is a graduate of the Infantry Officer Basic and Advanced courses, the Army Command and General Staff College, and the Army War College.

Military career 
Austin was commissioned as a second lieutenant after his graduation from West Point. His initial assignment was to the 3rd Infantry Division (Mechanized) in Germany.

Following this assignment and attendance at the Infantry Officer Advanced Course, he was assigned to the 82nd Airborne Division at Fort Bragg, North Carolina, where he commanded the Combat Support Company, 2nd Battalion (Airborne), 508th Infantry and served as the Assistant S-3 (Operations) for 1st Brigade.

In 1981, Austin was assigned to Indianapolis, Indiana, where he was the operations officer for the Army Indianapolis District Recruiting Command, and where he later commanded a company in the Army Recruiting Battalion. Upon conclusion of this assignment, he attended Auburn University, where he completed studies for a Master's in education. He then returned to the West Point as a company tactical officer for E-1.

After completion of the Army Command and General Staff College, Fort Leavenworth, Kansas, he was assigned to the 10th Mountain Division (Light Infantry), Fort Drum, New York, where he served as the S-3 (Operations) and later executive officer for the 2nd Battalion, 22nd Infantry. He subsequently served as Executive Officer for 1st Brigade, 10th Mountain, and later Director of Plans, Training, Mobilization, and Security for Fort Drum.In 1993, Austin returned to the 82nd Airborne Division where he commanded the 2d Battalion (Airborne), 505th Infantry. He later served as G-3 for the 82nd. 

Following graduation from Army War College, Carlisle, Pennsylvania, he returned to the 82nd Airborne Division for a third tour of duty there to command 3rd Brigade.

Shortly after brigade command, he served as Chief, Joint Operations Division, J-3, on the Joint Staff at The Pentagon in Arlington, Virginia. His next assignment was as Assistant Division Commander for Maneuver (ADC-M), 3rd Infantry Division (Mechanized), Fort Stewart, Georgia. As the ADC-M, he helped lead the division's invasion of Iraq in March 2003. Austin was awarded a Silver Star for his actions as commander during the invasion.

Austin served from September 2003 until August 2005 as Commanding General of 10th Mountain Division, as Commander, Combined Joint Task Force 180, during the War in Afghanistan. Subsequently, he was promoted to Chief of Staff of US Central Command at MacDill AFB, in Tampa, Florida, from September 2005 until October 2006.

On December 8, 2006, Austin was promoted to Lieutenant General and assumed command of XVIII Airborne Corps, Fort Bragg, North Carolina. In February 2008, Austin became the second highest ranking commander in Iraq, taking command of the Multi-National CorpsIraq (MNC-I). As commander of MNC-I, he directed the operations of approximately 152,000 joint and coalition forces in all sectors of Iraq.

Austin handed over command of XVIII Corps to become Director of the Joint Staff in August 2009. This promotion came at the direction of Admiral Michael Mullen, then Chairman of the Joint Chiefs of Staff. While Director, Austin was told by Mullen to increase the diversity of the Joint Staff. Austin credited the appointment as having jumpstarted his later career, saying: "People who might not have known Lloyd Austin began to know him."

Commanding General of US Forces – Iraq

On September 1, 2010, Austin became Commanding General (CG) of United States Forces – Iraq (USF-I) at a ceremony at Al-Faw Palace in Baghdad. He assumed the role from General Ray Odierno. As CG, USF-I, Austin was the senior military commander in charge of all US and remaining coalition forces in Iraq. Their mission was to advise, train, assist, and equip the Iraqi Armed Forces and the security agencies part of the Ministry of the Interior. As commander, Austin requested an additional troop presence in Iraq from 14,000 to 18,000.

Austin oversaw the transition from Operation Iraqi Freedom and combat operations to Operation New Dawn and stability operations focused on advising, assisting, and training the ISF. He was extensively involved in the internal U.S. discussions and then negotiations with the Iraqi Government leading up to the signing of the Strategic Partnership Agreement. Opposing total U.S. withdrawal, Austin preferred that the U.S. maintain about 10,000 troops in Iraq after 2011 and he approved staff planning for up to 20,000 remaining troops. He directed the drawdown of forces and the redeployment of approximately 50,000 service members. The U.S. command in Iraq formally cased its colors on December 15, 2011, at a reduced-sized BIAP complex, and Austin's speech there cited his division's seizure of the airport over eight years beforehand. Austin, along with other members of the USF-I staff, departed Iraq on December 18, 2011.

Army Vice Chief of Staff
In December 2011, Austin was nominated to become Vice Chief of Staff of the United States Army (VCSA). He took office on January 31, 2012. As VCSA, he managed the day-to-day administration of the Army's budget and headquarters staff. Under his direction, the Army took steps to reduce the incidence of suicide in the ranks. He also supervised a review of the psychiatric treatment of personnel assessed for disability by the Army.

United States Central Command
Austin became the commander of CENTCOM on March 22, 2013, after being nominated by President Obama in late 2012. Austin was preceded as CENTCOM Commander by General James Mattis, whom Austin would later succeed as Secretary of Defense. In this capacity, General Austin oversaw all United States troops deployed and major United States Military operations around the area of Middle-East and Central Asia and some parts of South Asia. The area of command consisted of 20 countries including Iraq, Syria, Yemen, Afghanistan, Egypt and Lebanon.

His approach as CENTCOM commander has been described as that of an "invisible general", due to his reluctance to speak publicly about military matters.

As commander, after ISIL seized control of Mosul in June 2014, Austin oversaw the development and execution of the military campaign plan to counter ISIL in Iraq and Syria. He had earlier described ISIL as a "flash in the pan". Obama would later tell The New Yorker that ISIL was a "jayvee" team. As of October 2014, Austin argued that the U.S. military's primary focus in operations against ISIL should be Iraq, as opposed to Syria. In 2015, Austin conceded in a Senate Committee on Armed Services hearing that a CENTCOM-developed U.S. program intended to train Syrians to combat ISIL had not been successful. At the hearing, he faced particularly pointed questioning from Senator John McCain over the direction of military engagement in Syria.

Austin's retirement ceremony took place at Joint Base Myer–Henderson Hall on April 5, 2016. During his departure and retirement ceremony, General Austin said that he was extremely proud of the achievements of the coalition's forces which always goes back to the troops. General Austin said "I'm very proud to have had the opportunity to lead troops in combat, I have seen our young leaders do amazing things in really tough and dangerous situations."

Private sector
Immediately after retiring as CENTCOM Commander, Austin joined the board of Raytheon Technologies, a military contractor, in April 2016. , his Raytheon stock holdings were worth roughly $500,000 and his compensation, including stock, totaled $2.7million. On September 18, 2017, he was appointed to Nucor's board of directors. On May 29, 2018, Austin was appointed as an independent director on the board of Tenet Healthcare. He also operates a consulting firm and has been a partner at Pine Island Capital, an investment company with which Secretary of State Antony Blinken and Michèle Flournoy are affiliated.

Secretary of Defense (2021–present)

Nomination and confirmation

On December 7, 2020, it was reported that President-elect Joe Biden would nominate Austin as Secretary of Defense. Biden became acquainted with Austin while Austin was CENTCOM commander in the Obama administration, and reportedly grew to trust Austin after receiving Austin's briefings. Like former defense secretary James Mattis, Austin required a congressional waiver of the National Security Act of 1947 to bypass the seven-year waiting period after leaving active-duty military, as prescribed by (a), in order to be appointed as Secretary of Defense. Austin's nomination, and the attendant requirement for a waiver, met with some concern in Congress regarding its implications for civil–military relations. Former Secretary of Defense Robert Gates and former Secretary of State Colin Powell, among others, issued statements supporting Austin's nomination.

The Senate Armed Services Committee held a confirmation hearing for Austin on January 19, 2021. On January 21, Congress granted Austin a waiver of the seven-year requirement by a 326–78 vote in the House and a 69–27 vote in the Senate. He was confirmed by the Senate in a 93–2 vote on January 22, 2021. Republican senators Josh Hawley and Mike Lee were the only "no" votes. Upon his confirmation and swearing-in later that day, Austin became the first black secretary of defense. Austin took office on January 22, 2021, after being sworn in by a Defense Department official, and was sworn in ceremonially by Vice President Kamala Harris on January 25, 2021.

Tenure

Several days after assuming office as Secretary of Defense, Austin visited the National Guard deployed to Washington D.C. Austin praised the Guard for protecting the Capitol in the days after the 2021 attack. During a press conference, he confirmed that the National Guard was expected to leave the U.S. Capitol within weeks and that there would be no further requests from federal authorities or lawmakers to keep the National Guard's troops in the Capitol complex following their March departure. Austin would subsequently order the troops stay through May.

Part of Austin's primary agenda as Secretary of Defense was the Department of Defense's plan—in coordination with Anthony Fauci, the chief medical advisor to the president—to confront the COVID-19 pandemic within the department. Austin's first step was to urge service members to get vaccinated, especially after the revelation that almost one-third of active-duty service members had turned down the opportunity to get administered the vaccine. In order to tout the safety of the coronavirus vaccine, Austin took the vaccine himself and also emphasized that taking the coronavirus vaccine will prevent disease among the troops, particularly those who were deployed overseas. On February 24, 2021, Austin visited U.S. Northern Command, Los Angeles, which is coordinating an immunization effort in the area in cooperation with the Federal Emergency Management Agency, to further investigate the fight against COVID-19.

Among his early political acts as Secretary of Defense, Austin removed former president Trump's appointees from the Pentagon advisory boards. As part of a review, he ordered their resignations, most notably former House Speaker Newt Gingrich and former Trump campaign manager Corey Lewandowski. Many of those removed were last minute political appointees after the 2020 election. On February 19, 2021, Austin directed his staff to gather more information about a viral TikTok video from a female Marine regarding a sexual misconduct case. On January 2, 2022, Austin announced that he tested positive for COVID-19 after experiencing symptoms at home. He received a COVID-19 vaccine booster in early October 2021.

Extremism in the ranks
Concerns of possible right-wing extremism among the troops caused Austin to implement new training requirements. On February 5, 2021, Austin announced that all members of the United States military would be required to stand down within the next 60 days in order to conduct training. The training includes the importance of the oath of office, a review of impermissible behaviors, and procedures for reporting suspected or actual extremist behavior.

Middle East

On February 19, 2021, Austin spoke to Saudi Crown Prince Mohammed bin Salman, saying that "We discussed the continued commitment to the 70-year US-Saudi security partnership, and I'm looking forward to working together to achieve regional security and stability." Austin expressed support for Saudi Arabia in the Iran–Saudi Arabia proxy conflict.

On February 25, 2021, under Biden's direction, Austin coordinated military defensive airstrikes against an Iranian-backed militia in Syria. Austin had previously recommended such airstrikes as a response to Iranian attacks on Americans in Iraq earlier in the month. It was also believed that the militia is responsible for killing a civilian contractor and injuring one American soldier as well as other troops in a missile attack on February 15, 2021.

On April 1, 2021, Austin and Turkish Minister of National Defense Hulusi Akar discussed the bilateral defense cooperation between the United States and its NATO ally Turkey.

On May 12, 2021, Austin condemned the rocket attacks into Israel and "conveyed the [Defense] Department’s ironclad support for Israel’s legitimate right to defend itself and its people."

Indo-Pacific

On February 25, 2021, Austin visited the aircraft carrier USS Nimitz. During his visit, he emphasized the need for American warships throughout the globe in order to deter security threats, mostly from China within the Indo-Pacific region and Iran within the Middle-East region.

In March 2021, Austin and Secretary of State Antony Blinken visited Japan and South Korea. The trip reflected the Biden administration's concerns about China's growing influence within the Indo-Pacific region, especially their military buildup during the pandemic, as well North Korea's nuclear threat and the recent coup d'état in Myanmar. The trip was also part of the Biden administration's "America is back" diplomatic theme, and Austin pledged the U.S.'s commitment to reaffirm ties with its allies and to maintain a robust military presence in the Indo-Pacific region. Austin added that denuclearization of the Korean Peninsula remains the Biden administration's top priority, and that the alliances with South Korea and Japan are among the most important tools the United States has in that regard.

Austin also made a three-day visit to India, where he met with his Indian counterpart Rajnath Singh, and other senior government officials. India drew closer to the United States following its tensions with China on their disputed Sino-Indian border. Austin urged India to cancel the planned purchase of Russia's S-400 air defence system.

Austin stated that "China is our pacing threat. We still maintain the edge and we’re going to increase the edge going forward." On June 11, 2022, he condemned China's "provocative, destabilising" military activity near Taiwan, a day after China's Defence Minister Wei Fenghe warned Austin that "if anyone dares to split Taiwan from China, the Chinese army will definitely not hesitate to start a war no matter the cost." Austin said the United States "will continue to fulfill our commitments under the Taiwan Relations Act. That includes assisting Taiwan in maintaining a sufficient self-defense capability." By February 2023, he had secured the U.S. military access to nine military bases in the Philippines, which is orthogonally situated between Taiwan and the South China Sea, expediting the full implementation of the Enhanced Defense Cooperation Agreement signed during the Obama administration.

Afghanistan

Austin expressed doubt that the Department of Defense would meet its May 1 deadline for the 2021 withdrawal of U.S. troops from Afghanistan. The Biden Administration announced on April 14, 2021, that a new deadline had been set for September 11, 2021. On March 21, 2021, he met President Ashraf Ghani in Kabul. Soon after the withdrawal of U.S. troops started, the Taliban launched an offensive against the Afghan government, quickly advancing in front of a collapsing Afghan Armed Forces. On July 24, 2021, Austin said: "In terms of whether or not [Afghanistan's military] will stop the Taliban, I think the first thing to do is to make sure that they can slow the momentum." On August 15, 2021, the Afghan government capitulated to Taliban forces.

Russia 

During the Russian war against Ukraine, the U.S. sent tens of billions of dollars in missiles, ammunition and other items to Ukraine. Austin said that he wanted to see "Russia weakened to the degree that it can't do the kinds of things that it has done in invading Ukraine". The New York Times reported that U.S. military may be providing real-time battlefield targeting intelligence to Ukraine. Austin said he "does not" believe that Russia's invasion of Ukraine will result in a nuclear war.

Personal life
Austin was raised by a devoutly Catholic mother and remains practicing himself. He has been described as an "intensely private" man who loathed talking to the news media when he was in Iraq and has a habit of "referring to himself in the third person".

Austin and his wife, Charlene Denise Banner Austin, have been married for over forty years. Charlene worked as a non-profit administrator and served on the board of the Military Family Research Institute at Purdue University. He has two stepsons.

Awards and decorations

2007 inductee into the Thomasville County Sports Hall of Fame.

Publications

Citations

General sources

Further reading

External links 

 
 Biography at the United States Department of Defense
 

1953 births
African-American members of the Cabinet of the United States
African-American United States Army personnel
Auburn University alumni
Biden administration cabinet members
Living people
Military leaders of the Iraq War
Military personnel from Mobile, Alabama
People from Thomasville, Georgia
Raytheon Technologies people
United States Army Command and General Staff College alumni
United States Army generals
United States Army personnel of the Iraq War
United States Army personnel of the War in Afghanistan (2001–2021)
United States Army Vice Chiefs of Staff
United States Army War College alumni
United States Military Academy alumni
United States Secretaries of Defense
Webster University alumni
African-American Catholics
Biden administration personnel